Atta-ur-Rahman (Urdu: عطاالرحمان; b. 22 September 1942),  is a Pakistani organic chemist and is currently serving as Professor Emeritus at the International Center for Chemical and Biological Sciences at the University of Karachi and as Chairman of PM Task Force on Science and Technology. He has twice served as the President of Pakistan Academy of Sciences (2003-2006, and 2011-2014). He was the Federal Minister of Science and Technology (2000-2002), Federal Minister of Education (2002) and Chairman Higher Education Commission with status of Federal Minister (2002-2008) He is also the President of the Network of Academies of Sciences in Countries of the Organisation of Islamic Countries (NASIC). After returning to Pakistan from Cambridge after completing his tenure as Fellow of Kings College, Cambridge University, he contributed to the development of the International Center for Chemical and Biological Sciences at the University of Karachi, and transforming the landscape of higher education, science and technology of Pakistan. He is Fellow of Royal Society (London) and Life Fellow of Kings College, Cambridge University, UK.

Education
Atta-ur-Rahman was born on 22 September 1942 in Delhi, British India (today's Republic of India) into an Urdu-speaking academic family. His grandfather, Sir Abdur Rahman, was a vice-chancellor of the University of Delhi (1934–38) who briefly served as a judge at the Madras High Court.

In 1946, Abdur Rahman was appointed as vice-chancellor of the Punjab University in Lahore, eventually relocating his family there, a year before the Partition of India took place. Abdur Rahman eventually became a Senior Justice at the Supreme Court of Pakistan in 1949. His father, Jamil-ur-Rahman, was a lawyer who established a cotton ginning textile industry in Okara, Punjab, Pakistan. After settling in Karachi in 1952, he passed the competitive O-Level and A-Level from the Karachi Grammar School and joined Karachi University.

Attending Karachi University in 1960, Rahman graduated with a bachelor's degree (with honors) in chemistry in 1963. He obtained a Master of Science (MSc) in organic chemistry in 1964 with first class and 1st position, and lectured at Karachi University for a year before receiving a Commonwealth Scholarship for doctoral studies in the United Kingdom. He joined King's College at the University of Cambridge and resumed research in natural products under John Harley-Mason. In 1968, Rahman received a Doctor of Philosophy (PhD) in organic chemistry; the subjects of his doctoral thesis were natural products and organic materials. He was elected as a fellow of King's College, University of Cambridge in 1969 and continued his research at Cambridge University until 1973. During that period, he is credited with correcting the earlier work of the Nobel Laureate Sir Robert Robinson on the chemistry of harmaline. Later in 2007, he was appointed as an honorary life fellow of King's College Cambridge.

Academic career
In 1964, Rahman joined the Karachi University as a lecturer in undergraduate chemistry. He remained associated with the Cambridge University between 1969 and 1973, and is presently honorary Life Fellow at the King's College of the Cambridge University. In 1977, he became the Co-director of the Hussain Ebrahim Jamal Research Institute of Chemistry at University of Karachi; eventually he was ascended as the Director in 1990. In 1979, Rahman did the post-doctoral research at the University of Tübingen. Upon returning to Pakistan, he joined Karachi University where he lectures and taught chemistry. He was appointed Professor Emeritus at University of Karachi for life. 

He carried out important studies on the synthesis of anti-cancer alkaloids present in the plant Catharanthus roseus and analytical studies on organic compounds involving circular dichroism and is generally recognized as bringing a huge positive change in the development of science and technology as well as higher education in Pakistan.

His book entitled "Stereoselctive Synthesis in Organic Chemistry" (Springer-Verlag) was termed a monumental contribution in the field by the Nobel Laureate Sir Derek Barton in the Foreword of the book written by him. His book entitled "NMR Spectroscopy-Basic Principles" was published by Springer-Verlag and translated into Japanese for use in university courses in Japan   The Nobel Laureate Herbert C. Brown applauded the contributions of Rahman in science and technology.

Positions held
 Fellow, King's College, Cambridge University (1969–1973, 2007– for Life)
 Professor at H.E.J. Research Institute of Chemistry at Karachi University
 Professor Emeritus at H.E.J. Research Institute of Chemistry at Karachi University (2012)
 Coordinator General of COMSTECH(1996–2012)
 Federal Minister of Science & Technology (2000–2002)
 Federal Minister of Education (2002)
 Federal Minister/Chairman, Higher Education Commission, Pakistan (resigned due to govt issues)(2002–2008)
 Advisor to the Prime Minister of Pakistan on Science and Technology(2002–2008)

Government work and political advocacy
After securing the fellowship of the Pakistan Academy of Sciences, Rahman had been affiliated with the Pakistan government regarding education and science affairs. From 1996 until 2012, Rahman served in the board of directors of the Committee on Scientific and Technological Cooperation, representing Pakistan's delegation. In 1997, Rahman served as the Coordinator General of the Organisation of Islamic Cooperation's (OIC) Committee on Scientific and Technological Cooperation (COMSTECH) that comprised 57 Ministers of Science and Technology from 57 OIC member countries. In recognition of his scientific transformation of Pakistan and building a large number of Centers of Excellence in the country as well as promoting scientific research, Prof. Rahman was conferred the TWAS Prize in Institution Building, in Durban, South Africa in 2009. Prof. Atta-ur-Rahman has seved as the Co-Chairman of UN ESCAP.

In 1999, he joined the Ministry of Science and Technology (MoSci) as its minister, assisting in drafting the official science policy of the country. In 2002, he was appointed as minister of the Ministry of Education (MoEd) as well as becoming the chairman of the Higher Education Commission (HEC) until resigning in 2008. Prof. Atta-ur-Rahman has also served as Chairman of the Prime Ministers National Task Force on Science and Technology, Co Chairman of Prime Ministers National Task Force on Information Technology and Telecommunications, and Vice Chairman of the Prime Ministers Task Force on Technology Driven Knowledge Economy  during the years 2019 to 2022.

Honours and awards

Atta-ur-Rahman has been selected as one of the 500 most influential personalities of the Islamic World. Institutions have been named after Rahman in China, the Atta-ur-Rahman Institute for Natural Product Discovery (AuRIns) in Malaysia and the Academician Professor Atta-ur-Rahman One Belt and One Road TCM Research Center were named after Rahman, as well as the Atta-ur-Rahman School of Applied Biosciences at the National University of Sciences & Technology (Islamabad, Pakistan) and the Atta-ur-Rahman Laboratories, International Center for Chemical and Biological Sciences at the University of Karachi (Karachi, Pakistan). The US Publisher ARKAT USA has published a special issue of the journal Arkivoc, Vol 2007, in honour of Atta-ur-Rahman FRS which had contributions from top scientists in the field of natural product chemistry. Similarly, the international journal Molecules published by the Swiss publisher MDPI published a special issue of the journal in honour of Atta-ur-Rahman. The World Academy of Science, Italy has introduced a special Prize in his honour (TWAS-Atta-ur-Rahman Award in Chemistry) for young scientists which is awarded once every two years

National and international Awards
In recognition of his eminent contributions in the field of organic chemistry, he has been conferred with many civil awards, including:
 Nishan-e-Imtiaz (2002) (highest national civil award)
 Hilal-e-Imtiaz (1998)
 Sitara-e-Imtiaz (1991)
 Tamgha-e-Imtiaz (1983)
 UNESCO Science Prize (1999)
 Grosse Goldene Ehrenzeischen am Bande(2007) high civil award by the Austrian government (2007)
 China, International Science and Technology Cooperation Award (2020) bestowed by Chinese President Xi Jinping in Beijing on January 7, 2020
 Academician, Chinese Academy of Sciences (2015)
 Friendship Award of China (2014)
 Vice President, The World Academy of Science (TWAS)
 Presient, Network of Academies of Science of Organising of Islamic Conference (NASIC)
 Member, Korean Academy of Science and Technology
 Einstein Professorship, Chinese Academy of Sciences
  Babai Urdu Award (1994)
  Scientist of the Year Award (for 1985)/Prize Rs. 200,000 (1987)
  FPCCI Prize for Technological Innovation (1985)
  Engro Excellence Award (2010)
  HEC, National Distinguished Professor (2011–present)
  Professor Emeritus, University of Karachi (2011–present)
 Lifetime Achievement Award by University of Management and Technology, Lahore (2012)

Fellowships
 Fellow of Academy of Sciences for the Developing World
 Fellow of Islamic World Academy of Sciences
 Foreign Fellow of Korean Academy of Sciences
 Fellow of Pakistan Academy of Sciences
 Fellow of the Royal Society, London (July 2006)
 Honorary Life Fellow King's College, Cambridge, UK (2007)
 Fellow of Chinese Chemical Society (1997)
 Foreign Academician of the Chinese Academy of Sciences (2015)

See also
 H.E.J. Research Institute of Chemistry
 Higher Education Commission
 Salimuzzaman Siddiqui
 Civil decorations of Pakistan

References

External links 

 
 Profile at IAS Website
 Pakistani leaders.com, Dr_Atta_ur_Rehman

|-

Living people
1942 births
Karachi Grammar School alumni
University of Karachi alumni
Academic staff of the University of Karachi
Pakistani chemists
Federal ministers of Pakistan
Organic chemists
Recipients of Hilal-i-Imtiaz
Recipients of Nishan-e-Imtiaz
Recipients of Sitara-i-Imtiaz
Recipients of the Pride of Performance
Alumni of King's College, Cambridge
Fellows of the Royal Society
Fellows of Pakistan Academy of Sciences
Foreign members of the Chinese Academy of Sciences

Recipients of the Grand Decoration with Sash for Services to the Republic of Austria
Presidents of the Pakistan Academy of Sciences
Fellows of the Islamic World Academy of Sciences